Tennessee is the sixteenth most populous state in the United States, and has the twentieth-highest population density. The 2020 United States census reported its population to be 6,916,897.

Population

The 2020 United States census reported Tennessee's population at 6,910,840, an increase of 564,735 since the 2010 United States census, or 8.90%. Between 2010 and 2019, the state received a natural increase of 124,385 (584,236 births minus 459,851 deaths), and an increase from net migration of 244,537 people into the state. Immigration from outside the U.S. resulted in a net increase of 66,412, and migration within the country produced a net increase of 178,125.

According to the 2010 census, 6.4% of Tennessee's population were under age5, 23.6% under 18, and 13.4% 65 or older. In recent years, Tennessee has been a top source of domestic migration, receiving an influx of people relocating from California, Illinois, New York, New Jersey, and New England due to the low cost of living and the booming healthcare and automotive industries. Metropolitan Nashville is one of the fastest-growing areas in the country due in part to these factors. In 2010, about 4.4% of Tennessee's population was foreign-born, an increase of about 118.5% since 2000. Of the foreign-born population, approximately 31.0% were naturalized citizens and 69.0% non-citizens. The foreign-born population consisted of approximately 49.9% from Latin America, 27.1% from Asia, 11.9% from Europe, 7.7% from Africa, 2.7% from Northern America, and 0.6% from Oceania.

Tennessee's center of population is in Murfreesboro in Rutherford County.

Race and ethnicity

In 2010, 4.6% of the total population was of Hispanic or Latino origin (they may be of any race), up from 2.2% in 2000. Between 2000 and 2010, the Hispanic population in Tennessee grew by 134.2%, the third-highest rate of any state. That same year Non-Hispanic whites were 75.6% of the population, compared to 63.7% of the population nationwide.

In 2010, the five most common self-reported ethnic groups in the state were: American (26.5%), English (8.2%), Irish (6.6%), German (5.5%), and Scotch-Irish (2.7%). Most Tennesseans who self-identify as having American ancestry are of English and Scotch-Irish ancestry. An estimated 21–24% of Tennesseans are of predominantly English ancestry. In the 1980 census 1,435,147 Tennesseans claimed "English" or "mostly English" ancestry out of a state population of 3,221,354 making them 45% of the state at the time.

On June 19, 2010, the Tennessee Commission of Indian Affairs granted state recognition to six Native American tribes, which was later repealed by the state's Attorney General because the action by the commission was illegal. The tribes were as follows:
 The Cherokee Wolf Clan in western Tennessee, with members in Carroll County, Benton, Decatur, Henderson, Henry, Weakley, Gibson and Madison counties.
 The Chikamaka Band, based historically on the South Cumberland Plateau, said to have members in Franklin, Grundy, Marion, Sequatchie, Warren and Coffee counties.
 Central Band of Cherokee, also known as the Cherokee of Lawrence County.
 United Eastern Lenape Nation of Winfield.
 The Tanasi Council, said to have members in Shelby, Dyer, Gibson, Humphreys and Perry counties; and
 Remnant Yuchi Nation, with members in Sullivan, Carter, Greene, Hawkins, Unicoi, Johnson and Washington counties.

Birth data

Notes
 Births in table do not add up, because Hispanics are counted both by their ethnicity and by their race, giving a higher overall number.
 Since 2016, data for births of White Hispanic origin are not collected, but included in one Hispanic group; persons of Hispanic origin may be of any race.

Religion

Tennessee has always been, and remains, predominantly Christian. About 81% of the population identifies as Christian, with Protestants making up 73% of the population. Of the Protestants in the state, Evangelical Protestants compose 52% of the population, Mainline Protestants 13%, and Historically Black Protestants 8%. Roman Catholics make up 6%, Latter-day Saints 1%, and Orthodox Christians less than 1%. The largest churches by number of adherents are the Southern Baptist Convention, the United Methodist Church, the Roman Catholic Church, and the Churches of Christ. Muslims and Jews each make up about 1% of the population, and adherents of other religions make up about 3% of the population. About 14% of Tennesseans are non-religious, with 11% identifying as "Nothing in particular", 3% as agnostics, and 1% as atheists.

Tennessee is included in most definitions of the Bible Belt, and is ranked as one of the nation's most religious states. It is home to several Protestant denominations, including the National Baptist Convention (headquartered in Nashville); the Church of God in Christ and the Cumberland Presbyterian Church (both headquartered in Memphis); and the Church of God and The Church of God of Prophecy (both headquartered in Cleveland). The Free Will Baptist denomination is headquartered in Antioch; its main Bible college is in Nashville. The Southern Baptist Convention maintains its general headquarters in Nashville. Nashville has publishing houses of several denominations.

References

Demographics of the United States by state